Hunt Valley may refer to:

Hunt Valley, Maryland
Hunt Valley (Baltimore Light Rail station)
Hunt Valley Towne Centre (formerly Hunt Valley Mall)

See also

 Valley (disambiguation)
 Hunt (disambiguation)